Texas Tech University, often referred to as Texas Tech or TTU, is a public, coeducational, research university located in Lubbock, Texas. Established on February 10, 1923, and originally known as Texas Technological College, it is the leading institution of the Texas Tech University System and has the sixth largest student body in the state of Texas. It is the only school in Texas to house an undergraduate institution, law school, and medical school at the same location. Initial enrollment in 1925 was 910 students; as of 2009, the university has 30,049 students from more than 110 countries, all 50 U.S. states and the District of Columbia. Since its first graduating class in 1927 of 26 students, Texas Tech has awarded more than 221,000 degrees, including 45,000 graduate and professional degrees to its alumni. The Texas Tech Alumni Association, with over 27,000 members, operates more than 120 chapters in cities throughout the United States and the world.

Throughout Texas Tech's history, alumni have played prominent roles in many different fields. Among the university's Distinguished Alumni is Demetrio B. Lakas, President of the Republic of Panama from 1969 to 1978. Three United States Governors, Daniel I. J. Thornton, Governor of Colorado from 1951 to 1955, John Burroughs, Governor of New Mexico from 1959 to 1961, and Preston Smith, Governor of Texas from 1968 to 1972, are graduates of the university. Five astronauts, including Rick Husband, the final commander of Space Shuttle Columbia and recipient of the Congressional Space Medal of Honor. U.S. Marine Corps Major and Medal of Honor recipient, George H. O'Brien, Jr., is a distinguished alumnus. Richard E. Cavazos is a two-time Distinguished Service Cross recipient and the first Hispanic and Mexican American to advance to the rank of four-star general in the U.S. Army. The school's influence on the business world is seen in such people as General Motors Chairman and CEO Edward Whitacre, Jr., Finisar CEO Jerry S. Rawls, Belo Corporation CEO Dunia A. Shive, and ExxonMobil board member Angela Braly, ranked by Fortune magazine as the most powerful woman in business. Others among the university's alumni are folk rocker John Denver, country singer Pat Green, and actor George Eads. John Hinckley, Jr., who attempted to assassinate U.S. President Ronald Reagan in 1981, attended the university sporadically from 1973 to 1980.

Alumni

 "—" indicates that class year is unknown.
To sort these tables by alumni or class year, click on the  icon next to the column title.

Arts and literature

Business

Education

Entertainment

Government, law, and public policy

Journalism and media

Military

Music

Science, technology and medicine

Honorary

Sports

Texas Tech University alumni have also made contributions to field of sports. Former Red Raiders have gone on to compete in the Canadian Football League (CFL), Major League Baseball (MLB), National Basketball League (NBA), National Football League (NFL), PGA Tour, and Women's National Basketball Association (WNBA). Approximately 94 alumni have been selected to the MLB Draft, 19 alumni have been selected in the NBA Draft, 149 alumni have been selected in the NFL Draft, and 9 alumni have been selected in the WNBA Draft. Texas Tech alumni have also gone on to coach collegiate and professional teams.

See also 

 List of sportspeople educated at Texas Tech University

Notes

References 

Alumni
Texas Tech University alumni